Verné Lesche, married Vanberg (11 October 1917 – 21 April 2002) was a speed skater from Finland who twice won the World Allround Championships.

Lesche was born in Helsinki, Finland, and already skated a world record in 1933 when she was only 15 years old. Her successes continued and she won the world title for the first time in 1939, when Tampere hosted the World Allround Championships. She won it for the second time in Drammen in 1947, making her the only speed skater in history to have won a medal at the World Allround Championships both before and after World War II. At those 1947 World Championships, Lesche won all four distances and the difference in samalog points with the silver medallist, Norwegian skater Else Marie Christiansen, was 20.923 points – the largest difference in history between numbers one and two at an international championship. Of this 20.923 point difference, 6.983 points (equal to 41.9 seconds) were the difference between Lesche and Christiansen on the 3,000 m, while Lesche recorded a 9.690 point difference over Christiansen on the 5,000 m by skating that distance 1 minute and 36.9 seconds faster than the Norwegian.

A very rare event took place at the Finnish Allround Championships in 1948. Lesche won one distance and finished second on the other three, and her resulting samalog score was better than that of any of her opponents. However, Eevi Huttunen had finished second on one distance while winning the other three, and the rule at the time was that a competitor would automatically be the winner by finishing first on at least three distances. So despite having the best samalog score, Lesche won only silver. The most famous occurrence of this application of the three distance wins rule was at the 1983 World Allround Championships, when Rolf Falk-Larssen became World Champion despite silver medallist Tomas Gustafson having a better samalog score.

Lesche's last international appearance was at the 1949 World Allround Championships where she finished fifth overall and set a new world record on the 5,000 m. Lesche-Vanberg died in Kongsberg, Norway, at the age of 84.

Her son, Marcel Lesche Vanberg, was active in speed skating first as a speed skater himself and later as a starter. He was one of the official starters at the olympics at the 2006 Winter Olympics in speed skating.

Medals
An overview of medals won by Lesche at important championships she participated in, listing the years in which she won each:

Note that the World Allround Championships of 1934 were unofficial.

World records
Over the course of her career, Lesche skated four world records:

Personal records
To put these personal records in perspective, the WR column lists the official world records on the dates that Lesche skated her personal records.

Note that Lesche's personal record on the 500 m was not a world record because Synnøve Lie skated 50.3 at the same tournament. Also note that the old combination was not an official world record event, as governed by the International Skating Union, until 1949, and that the small combination was not an official world record event until 1983.

Lesche has an Adelskalender score of 217.896 points.

References

Notes

Bibliography

 Bijlsma, Hedman with Tom Dekkers; Arie van Erk; Gé du Maine; Hans Niezen; Nol Terwindt and Karel Verbeek. Schaatsseizoen '96-'97: 25e Jaargang 1996-1997, statistische terugblik. Assen, the Netherlands: Stichting Schaatsseizoen, 1997. .
 Eng, Trond. All Time International Championships, Complete Results: 1889 - 2002. Askim, Norway: WSSSA-Skøytenytt, 2002.
 Teigen, Magne. Komplette Resultater Internasjonale Mesterskap 1889 - 1989: Menn/Kvinner, Senior/Junior, allround/sprint. Veggli, Norway: WSSSA-Skøytenytt, 1989. (Norwegian)

External links

 Verné Lesche at SkateResults.com
 Evert Stenlund's Adelskalender pages
 Verné Lesche. Deutsche Eisschnelllauf Gemeinschaft e.V. (German Skating Association).
 Historical World Records. International Skating Union.
 Medal Winners in World Allround Championships. International Skating Union.
 

1917 births
2002 deaths
Finnish female speed skaters
Sportspeople from Helsinki
World record setters in speed skating
World Allround Speed Skating Championships medalists